Tibirita is a municipality and town of Colombia in the department of Cundinamarca. It borders Villapinzón in the north, in the east La Capilla (Boyacá), in the south Guateque (Boyacá) and in the west Manta, Machetá and Chocontá.

History 
The area of Tibiritá was populated by the Muisca before the Spanish conquest of the Muisca in the 1530s. The village was ruled by the zaque of Hunza, present day capital of Boyacá Tunja. Modern Tibiritá was founded on July 9th, 1553 by Miguel de Ibarra. The name Tibiritá is Chibcha.

Economy 
Main economical activity of Tibiritá is dairy farming.

Born in Tibiritá 
 Rufino Cuervo Barreto, 4 months president of the Republic of New Granada

References 

Municipalities of Cundinamarca Department
Populated places established in 1593
1593 establishments in the Spanish Empire
Muisca Confederation
Muysccubun